The Étoile de Bessèges is an early-season five-day road bicycle racing stage race held annually around Bessèges, in the Gard department of the Languedoc-Roussillon region of France. First organized in 1971 as a one-day race, it became a stage race run over five days in 1974. Since 2005, it is on the calendar of the UCI Europe Tour as a 2.1 event and features as the earliest stage races of the European season.

The Étoile de Bessèges is the first of several stage races held in the hilly South of France in February, preceding La Méditerranéenne, the Tour du Haut Var and the Tour La Provence. These early-season races are competed mainly by French teams and are considered preparations for Paris–Nice, the first European World Tour event in March.

Winners

References

External links

 
UCI Europe Tour races
Cycle races in France
Sport in Gard
Recurring sporting events established in 1971
1971 establishments in France